"Angels from the Realms of Glory" is a Christmas carol written by Scottish poet James Montgomery.  It was first printed in the Sheffield Iris on Christmas Eve 1816, though it only began to be sung in churches after its 1825 reprinting in the Montgomery collection The Christian Psalmist and in the Religious Tract Society's The Christmas Box or New Year's Gift.

Tune
Before 1928, the hymn was sung to a variety of tunes, including "Regent Square" by Henry Smart, "Lewes" by John Randall, and "Wildersmouth" or "Feniton Court" by Edward Hopkins.  In the United States, "Regent Square" is the most common tune.  In the United Kingdom, however, the hymn came to be sung to the French carol tune "Iris" (Les anges dans nos campagnes, the tune used for "Angels We Have Heard on High") after this setting was published in the Oxford Book of Carols. Sometimes the "Gloria in excelsis Deo" refrain is even sung in place of Montgomery's original lyric: "Come and worship Christ the new-born King".

The name for the "Regent Square" tune is reportedly an association with the publisher of the first hymnal to contain it, James Hamilton, who was the minister of the Regent Square Church situated in London.

Text

Angels, from the realms of glory,
Wing your flight o'er all the earth;
Ye who sang creation's story,
Now proclaim Messiah's birth:

Refrain: Come and worship,
Come and worship 
Worship Christ, the newborn King.

Shepherds, in the fields abiding,
Watching o'er your flocks by night,
God with man is now residing,
Yonder shines the infant light:

Refrain.

Sages, leave your contemplations,
Brighter visions beam afar;
Seek the great Desire of nations,
Ye have seen his natal star:

Refrain.

Saints before the altar bending,
Watching long in hope and fear,
Suddenly the Lord, descending,
In his temple shall appear.

Refrain.

Sinners, wrung with true repentance,
Doomed for guilt to endless pains,
Justice now revokes the sentence,
Mercy calls you—break your chains:

Refrain.

Though an infant now we view him,
He shall fill his Father's throne,
Gather all the nations to him;
Every knee shall then bow down:

Refrain.

All creation, join in praising
God the Father, Spirit, Son,
Evermore your voices raising,
To th'eternal Three in One:

Refrain.

See also
 List of Christmas carols

References

Christmas carols
1816 songs
Scottish folk songs
Protestant hymns
Epiphany music
Songs with lyrics by James Montgomery (poet)